The Perth foreshore may refer to:

 The foreshore of Perth Water on either the northern or southern side of the Swan River, Western Australia
 Esplanade Reserve, the area between Perth Water and the Perth central business district, Western Australia